Paweł Stolarski (born 28 January 1996) is a Polish professional footballer who plays as a right-back for the Ekstraklasa club Pogoń Szczecin.

Club career

On 28 February 2013, Stolarski made his debut, aged just 17, for Wisła Kraków in the Polish Cup match against Jagiellonia Białystok. After that, he played for Lechia Gdańsk.

International career
Stolarski played for Poland national under-17 football team during 2013 UEFA Under-17 Championship qualifying round, scoring two game-winning goals. He was the captain of the national side during the 2013 UEFA European Under-17 Football Championship elite round.

Career statistics

Club

Honours

Club
Legia Warsaw
Ekstraklasa: 2019-20, 2020-21

References

External links
 

1996 births
Living people
Polish footballers
Poland youth international footballers
Poland under-21 international footballers
Ekstraklasa players
I liga players
III liga players
Wisła Kraków players
Lechia Gdańsk players
Zagłębie Lubin players
Legia Warsaw players
Pogoń Szczecin players
Footballers from Kraków
Association football defenders
Association football midfielders